3-(N-methylpyrrolidin-3-ylmethyl)indole (MPMI) is a tryptamine derivative which acts as a serotonin receptor agonist. It has been studied as an analogue and trace impurity of the anti-migraine drug eletriptan but is otherwise little known.

See also 
 α,N,N-Trimethyltryptamine
 Dimethyltryptamine
 4-HO-MPMI
 5F-MPMI
 5-MeO-MPMI
 NTBT
 Pyr-T
 SN-22

References 

Designer drugs
Psychedelic tryptamines
Serotonin receptor agonists
Tryptamines
Pyrrolidines